The 1953 World Table Tennis Championships women's singles was the 20th edition of the women's singles championship.
Angelica Rozeanu defeated Gizi Farkas in the final by three sets to one, to win a fourth consecutive title.

Results

See also
List of World Table Tennis Championships medalists

References

-
1953 in women's table tennis